Kenneth William Bryant (12 November 1922 – 17 May 1990) was an Australian rules footballer who played with St Kilda in the Victorian Football League (VFL).

Bryant played three  games for St Kilda while serving in the Royal Australian Air Force during World War II.

Notes

External links 

1922 births
1990 deaths
Australian rules footballers from Melbourne
St Kilda Football Club players
Royal Australian Air Force personnel of World War II
Military personnel from Melbourne